Fishing in Egypt includes every form of fishing as a hobby or  professional nowadays. In Egypt, fishing is really developed and the country is considered one of the best fishing destinations in the world.

History, Spots, Season 

The history of fishing date back to the ancient Egyptian. Egypt can be defined as the bedrock of fishing because the Egyptian civilization at the time has been one of the first to introduce this practice in the world. Nowadays, fishing is still very advanced in the country especially in the sea coasts and inland waters. The most important places are:

-The Nasser Lake

-Sharm El Sheikh

-Hurgada

-Marsa Alam

-The Nile

-The Mediterranean Sea

-The Gulf of Suez

Most of the time, fishermen go to the Red Sea coasts as Sharm El Sheikh, Hurgada or Marsa Alam which are the three best spots to go fishing in Egypt. The best period to catch fish stretch from January to March. However, at the Red Sea coasts it's conceivable to fish at any period of the year because even in winter the temperature is always very high and it rain very rarely. These very good climatic conditions all year round make the country be very attractive for professional and also for beginner.

Fishing Equipment 

In ancient Egypt, smaller fish were caught with weir-baskets and dragnets made from willow branches, as well as hooks, harpoons, and lines with the hooks ranging from eight millimetres and eighteen centimetres. Fishing rods tended not to be used, as the fisherman would use his finger to support the line, using clay to weigh the hooks down. For bait, usually, bread or dates would have been used. After being caught, the fish would have been clubbed and then placed in baskets.
Big nets are used for commercial fishing where the focus is on quantity, but otherwise, for trolling, shore fishing and line fishing, the equipment used is essentially the same as is used in other parts of the world. In the Nasser Lake, the trolling rods are of 20–30 lb class and between 7 and 9 feet, alongside multipliers that are able to hold more than 200 yards of 30lb line. For shore fishing, 10–12 feet should be the size of the rod, with reels big enough to hold at least 200 yards of line. The lines used tend to be very strong thanks to the strong species of fish found, a 30-40lb monofilament is usually used for trolling and usually, for heavy-duty shore fishing, a 20lb B.S is needed.
For the species of fish found in Egypt please see List of fishes in the Red Sea it was also known as the best.

Revenues 

Egypt's fishing industry produced 1,337,778 tonnes of fish in 2010. 334,947 tonnes were sold to the home market, while 5,175 tonnes were sold to the domestic market.

Fishing revenue is divided into two sub sectors, the aquaculture sector and the capture sector. The aquaculture sector produced 705,500 and the capture sector produced 374,000 tonnes in 2009. In total, 1,079,500 tonnes of fish were sold. Egypt's fishing industry production has increased in the last decades. This is mainly due to an increase of the aquaculture sector. The aquaculture sector is the largest sector and accounts for almost 65% of the supply. 99% of production comes from privately owned farms. Tilapia and Mullets are the two most common species in the aquaculture sector.

The development of the aquaculture sector is the main reason for the significant rise in revenues in the last decades. The first modern semi-intensive commercial farm was opened in 1961 by the Egyptian government. The government introduced a specific development program in order to develop the aquaculture sector in the end of the 1970s. The annual aquaculture revenues grew from 17,000 tonnes to 45,000 tonnes by the beginning of 1980s.

Laws and Regulations 

Fishing in Egypt has its own rules and regulations because people tend to fish in an excessive way, in addition many fishermen use techniques that pollute the inner lakes and fishing spots. All lakes in Egypt are open to fishing except the restricted areas because its mainly touristic sight-seeing, also skiing and jet skiing is restricted in many lakes because it damages the fishing environment. Some boat types are restricted in fishing areas such as racing boats. The bass tournaments are popular between fishermen in Egypt, but to participate in such an event you have to be registered at a fishing association. These fishing tournaments are only allowed at a certain time of year so it does not damage the bass population of the lakes. It is prohibited to troll or jug in ski areas. Fishermen have a limited quantity of fish that they are allowed to fish per day and it depends on the type of fish. It is strictly prohibited to catch new born fishes because it endangers their existence.   In addition, a boat cannot anchor less than 100 feet away from shoreline to respect the privacy of homeowners. Swimming is prohibited except in swimming areas for security issues, and of course skinny dipping is prohibited. Any kind of chemical treatments may not be used under any circumstances. Night lighting must within the permitted areas due to security issues. In any circumstances if rules are broken the fisherman may get arrested or may be denied of future entry to the lake.

In 2018, a state plan to purify lakes and expand fisheries increased domestic fish production. In early January 2019 Egypt imposed a 7-month ban on fishing in the Red Sea to last between February and September. An Egyptian official said the aim of 7 month prohibition was to improve the biological balance in the sea and increase fish production.

References

External links
 
 
 
 
 
 
 

Egypt
Economy of Egypt